Karagay is a rural locality (a selo) and the administrative centre of Karagayskoye Rural Settlement, Ust-Koksinsky District, the Altai Republic, Russia. The population was 446 as of 2016. There are 14 streets.

Geography 
Karagay is located 92 km northwest of Ust-Koksa (the district's administrative centre) by road. Kurdyum is the nearest rural locality.

References 

Rural localities in Ust-Koksinsky District